Five ships of the French Navy have borne the name Melpomène, in honour of the muse Melpomene.

Ships 
 , a 40-gun  
 , a 44-gun  
 , a 60-gun  
 , a schoolship frigate 
  (1937), a torpedo boat, lead ship of her class.

See also

Citations and references

Citations

References

Further reading

French Navy ship names